The 2016–17 Israeli Basketball State Cup was the 57th edition of the Israeli Basketball State Cup, organized by the Israel Basketball Association. Maccabi Tel Aviv won its 44th State Cup title after beating Hapoel Jerusalem in the Final.

First round
Maccabi Tel Aviv, Maccabi Rishon LeZion, Maccabi Haifa, Maccabi Ashdod, Bnei Herzliya and Ironi Nes Ziona were pre-qualified for the Round of 16 and did not have to play in the First Round.

Round of 16

Quarterfinals

Final four

Bracket

Semifinals

Final

See also
2016–17 Israeli Basketball Super League

2016-17
State Cup